PS Klabat XIII Jaya Sakti (or abbreviation of Persatuan Sepakbola Klabat XIII Jaya Sakti) is an Indonesian football team based in Klabat Stadium, Manado, North Sulawesi. This team competes in Liga 3 North Sulawesi zone.

References

External links

 Manado
Football clubs in Indonesia
Football clubs in North Sulawesi